EMCO or Emco may refer to:
 Emco, a manufacturing company and maker of Unimat
 EMCO Enterprises, a subsidiary of the  Andersen Corporation
 Enhanced Movement Control Order, part of the Malaysian movement control order
 Extracorporeal membrane oxygenation (EMCO), respiratory support medical equipment